Geothermal is related to energy and may refer to:
 Earth's internal heat budget, accounting of the flows of energy at and below the surface of the planet's crust
 The geothermal gradient, which directs the flows of heat within the Earth
 Geothermal energy, useful energy generated and stored in the Earth. The energy can be used for:
 district heating within buildings and industry
 geothermal power plants to generate electricity
 Geothermal exploration, the search for commercially usable geothermal energy

Renewable technology 
 Earth sheltering, constructing a building into a hill side or Earth berm to reduce heating and cooling requirements
 Earth cooling tubes, using ambient Earth temperature to cool and dehumidify air
 Geothermal desalination, the production of fresh water using heat energy extracted from underground rocks
 Geothermal heating, methods of heating and cooling a building using underground heat
 Geothermal electricity, electricity generated from naturally occurring geological heat sources
 Geothermal heat pump (GHP), a device used for heating and cooling using the earth as a heat reservoir
Direct exchange geothermal heat pump, a method of heating and cooling with the energy of the earth using direct exchange of heat
 Hot dry rock geothermal energy, heating water in hot deep rock